Compeer, Inc. is an international, non-profit organization that aims to help people by overcoming the effects of mental illness. The founding Compeer program was established in Rochester, New York, in 1973 by Bernice W. Skirboll.

Volunteer-based model 
The Compeer model matches a volunteer from the community with an individual with mental illness from the same community. The volunteers are provided training information as well as resources related to mental health care throughout the program. Adult volunteers regularly spend time with an adult or youth who is receiving mental health services. The goal is to provide supportive friendships for people in mental health care, typically as a complement to other therapies, in order to help and support them on their journey of recovery from mental illness.

The National Institute of Mental Health chose Compeer as a model program in 1982 and helped fund the development of similar programs throughout the United States. Today, Compeer is an international mental health organization, with approximately 5,000 volunteers at nearly 100 locations in the U.S., Canada, and Australia. Its volunteer program has more than 80 chapters that serve about 65,000 adults and children around the world.

References

External links

Compeer International Home Page
List of Compeer Program Locations

Charities for disabled people
Mental health organizations in New York (state)